Kymatocalyx rhizomaticus is a species of liverwort in the Cephaloziellaceae family. It is endemic to Malaysia. It was previously known as Stenorrhipis rhizomatica.

References

Flora of Peninsular Malaysia
Jungermanniales
Least concern plants
Taxonomy articles created by Polbot